Gilliam Vermeulen (born 12 November 1966) is a Namibian cricketer. He played in twelve first-class and three List A matches for Boland from 1985/86 to 1988/89 in South Africa.

See also
 List of Boland representative cricketers

References

External links
 

1966 births
Living people
Namibian cricketers
South African cricketers
Boland cricketers